The Hydrogenophilaceae are a family of the Hydrogenophilalia, with two genera – Hydrogenophilus and Tepidiphilus. Like all Pseudomonadota, they are Gram-negative. All known species are thermophilic, growing around 50 °C and using molecular hydrogen or organic molecules as their source of electrons to support growth - some species are autotrophs.

The genus Thiobacillus was previously considered to be a member in this family but was reclassified into the order Nitrosomonadales at the same time that the Hydrogenophilales were removed from the Betaproteobacteria and the class Hydrogenophilalia was formed.

Hydrogenophilus thermoluteolus is a facultative chemolithoautotroph originally isolated from a hot spring; however, it was detected 2004 in ice core samples retrieved from a depth around 3 km within the ice covering Lake Vostok in Antarctica. The presence of DNA from (and potentially live cells of) thermophilic bacteria in the ice suggests that a geothermal system could exist beneath the cold water body of Lake Vostok, or simply that non-thermophilic strains of Hydrogenophilus exist and were present in the ice.

References

Hydrogenophilales
Hydrogenophilalia